Yelena Komarova (born July 13, 1985) is an amateur Azerbaijani wrestler, who played for the women's featherweight category. Komarova qualified for the women's 55 kg class at the 2008 Summer Olympics in Beijing by winning the championship title from the Golden Grand Prix in Baku. She lost the first preliminary match to Russia's Nataliya Golts, who was able to score five points in two straight periods, leaving Komarova without a single point.

References

External links
Profile – International Wrestling Database
NBC 2008 Olympics profile

Azerbaijani female sport wrestlers
1985 births
Living people
Olympic wrestlers of Azerbaijan
Wrestlers at the 2008 Summer Olympics
20th-century Azerbaijani women
21st-century Azerbaijani women